3-on-3 basketball at the 2017 Pacific Mini Games was held in Port Vila, Vanuatu on 11–14 December 2017. This was the first time the three-on-three variant was contested at a Pacific Mini Games, although regular basketball tournaments have been played previously.

Participating nations
Nine men's teams and seven women's teams participated:

Men's tournament

Women's tournament

Medal summary

Medal table

Medalists

See also
 Basketball at the Pacific Games

References

3x3 basketball competitions
2017 in 3x3 basketball
2017 Pacific Mini Games
Basketball in Vanuatu